Muswell Hill Baptist Church is a Baptist church in Muswell Hill, London, and a Grade II listed building with Historic England. It was built between 1900 and 1901 by G. & R. P. Baines.

References

External links

1901 in London
Baptist churches in London
Churches completed in 1901
Churches in the London Borough of Haringey
Grade II listed buildings in the London Borough of Haringey
Grade II listed churches in London
Muswell Hill